is a Japanese manga series written and illustrated by Kōsuke Fujishima. It was serialized in Kodansha's seinen manga magazines Morning Party Zōkan and Morning from 1986 through 1992. It centers on a fictional police station in Sumida, Tokyo, as its officers tackle everyday criminals while keeping people safe. It mixes both drama and action with some comedy and humor.

The chapters of You're Under Arrest have been collected in seven tankōbon volumes by Kodansha. The manga has been adapted into three television seasons, three OVA series and a film, all animated by Studio Deen. The series also spawned a live-action drama special starring Misaki Ito and Sachie Hara. The show has received positive reviews from critics.

Story

The story revolves around Natsumi Tsujimoto and Miyuki Kobayakawa, two female officers of the Tokyo Metropolitan Police Department and the protagonists of the show as they are stationed at the fictional Bokuto Police Station located at Sumida, Tokyo. The series is largely episodic, and it focuses on the interaction between the main characters and the humorous supporting cast.

The majority of the series takes place in the Greater Tokyo Area. However, the site where the Bokuto Police Station is supposed to be does not exist in the Sumida Ward. In reality, the Bokuto Hospital takes its place.

Media

Manga
The English version of the manga was published by Dark Horse Comics, which only contained selected episodes from volumes 6 and 7 (reportedly at Fujishima's request, resulting in continuity confusion by some fans of the series). The final frame of the last Japanese volume refers to a You're Under Arrest 2, which has not yet been serialized.

A special one-shot chapter, titled "Taiho Shichauzo GP", will appear in Monthly Afternoon on December 23, 2022.

Original release

Dark Horse Comics release

First Shinsōban edition

Second Shinsōban edition

Bunkoban

Anime
The series was first adapted into a four-episode OVA series, directed by Kazuhiro Furuhashi, which was released in Japan from 1994 to 1995. An animated television series subsequently aired in Japan on TBS between 1996 and 1997, spanning a total of 47 episodes. It was also broadcast on Rai in Italy, NTV7 in Malaysia, Hero TV in the Philippines and TTV and AXN-Taiwan in Taiwan. 20 7-minute Mini specials and one full length episode was created and broadcast on TBS in 1999. A 26 episode sequel to the series also aired on TBS in 2001. A third animated television series, aired from 2007 to 2008. Animated by Studio Deen and produced by Bandai Visual, the series featured character designs by Atsuko Nakajima and music by Kow Otani and Yasunori Iwasaki. The first two television series were aired with English subtitles on AXN Asia's networks in Southeast Asia and South Asia.

AnimEigo licensed the initial OVA series, the first television series, and the only full-length television episode of You're Under Arrest that aired in 1999 for North American release. ADV Films subsequently released the 1999 mini TV episodes that comprised the rest of You're Under Arrest! Mini-Specials as well as the movie. The 2001 TV series, the 2002 OVA TV special and Full Throttle are licensed in North America by Sentai Filmworks and distributed by the new company Section23 Films.

In South Korea, Tooniverse licensed the OVA series until 2nd season.

TBS is in charge of promoting the 2nd season, movie and Full Throttle! outside of Japan.

Movie
The movie ran for 90 minutes in the US and 92 minutes in France.

Video game
Released on March 29, 2001 by Pioneer LDC for the PlayStation, the game is a text adventure game that introduces three new characters. One of them is a detective named Ryosuke Arisugawa, a 24-year-old plainclothed officer assigned to Bokuto Police Station in order to identify and arrest a hacker who was trying to break into the precinct's network system. Another character is his 18-year-old sister Chiharu Arisugawa, who the player must keep an eye on.

Players can assign various characters from the Bokuto Station to conduct patrols around the neighborhood.

Novel
A novel was published by Kodansha. It is a stand-alone story from the series, detailing a fight with Miyuki and Natsumi due to the latter being late for work again in Bokuto Station. Work on the novel had been supervised by Kōsuke Fujishima himself personally with Atsuko Nakajima doing the artwork in the novel.

TV drama
A TV drama was created and aired on TV Asahi in 2002. The opening theme song was called "Galaxy" by Nana Katase, and the closing theme was "Through the Rain" by Mariah Carey. It adapted the main characters while adding new characters over the course of the nine-episode series. The drama also advances the romantic relationships of the main characters. Each episode ran for 45 minutes each.

Model kits
Two models were created and titled Honda Today and Natsumi's motorcycle. Each are  scale.

Reception
Shortly after You're Under Arrest 2 came out, You're Under Arrest was among the top 10 anime shows in Newtypes August 2001 issue.

Regarding the Full Throttle revival series, Theron Martin commented that "Little that the series does in these episodes is especially fresh or memorable, but if you were always a fan of the Bokuto Traffic Section's antics in the earlier series then that enjoyment is unlikely to fade here.". Similarly, Chris Beveridge said that "Though this season pales for a lot of people because some of the supporting cast are either minimized or gone entirely, I appreciated the return to dealing with the core cast of characters after all this time.".

References

External links
Official TBS website 

 
1986 manga
1994 anime OVAs
1996 anime television series debuts
1996 Japanese television series debuts
1997 Japanese television series endings
1999 anime films
1999 anime television series debuts
1999 Japanese television series debuts
1999 Japanese television series endings
2001 anime television series debuts
2001 Japanese television series debuts
2001 Japanese television series endings
2002 anime OVAs
2002 Japanese television series debuts
2002 Japanese television series endings
You're Under Arrest: Full Throttle
You're Under Arrest: Full Throttle
You're Under Arrest: Full Throttle
Action anime and manga
ADV Films
Bandai Visual
Comedy anime and manga
Dark Horse Comics titles
Japanese drama television series
Kodansha manga
NBCUniversal Entertainment Japan
Police in anime and manga
Seinen manga
Sentai Filmworks
Sharp Point Press titles
Studio Deen
TBS Television (Japan) original programming
Tokyo Metropolitan Police Department in fiction
TV Asahi original programming
Wonderful (TV programming block)